Pavel Kanstantsinavich Lyzhyn (born 24 March 1981 in Vysokaye) is a Belarusian shot putter. His personal best throw is 21.21 metres from 2010. He threw a personal best throw of 20.98 metres at the 2008 Olympics in Beijing which originally translated into a fourth place, just 5 cm short of the bronze medal winner and 11 cm short of the silver. However, on 25 November 2016 the IOC disqualified him from the 2008 Olympic Games and struck his results from the record for failing a drugs test in a re-analysis of his doping sample from 2008.

He competed at the 2012 Summer Olympics, finishing in 8th, with a throw of 20.69 m.

Lyzhyn also throws the discus, and has a personal best throw of 61.72 metres

Achievements

References
Notes

Source
 

1981 births
Living people
Belarusian male shot putters
Belarusian male discus throwers
Athletes (track and field) at the 2004 Summer Olympics
Athletes (track and field) at the 2008 Summer Olympics
Athletes (track and field) at the 2012 Summer Olympics
Athletes (track and field) at the 2016 Summer Olympics
Olympic athletes of Belarus
People from Kamenets District
Doping cases in athletics
Belarusian sportspeople in doping cases
Universiade medalists in athletics (track and field)
Universiade silver medalists for Belarus
Sportspeople from Brest Region